Daniil Medvedev defeated Dominic Thiem in the final, 4–6, 7–6(7–2), 6–4 to win the singles tennis title at the 2020 ATP Finals. Medvedev became the fourth man to defeat the world's top-three ranked players en route to a title (after David Nalbandian, Novak Djokovic and Boris Becker).

Stefanos Tsitsipas was the defending champion, but was eliminated in the round-robin stage. This marked the first time since 2009 that the defending champion was eliminated in the round-robin stage.

Novak Djokovic was attempting to equal Roger Federer's record of six Tour Finals titles, but was defeated by Thiem in the semifinals. His loss guaranteed a maiden ATP Finals titlist for the fifth consecutive year. Rafael Nadal was attempting to become only the second man (after Andre Agassi) to complete the career Super Slam, but was defeated by Medvedev in the semifinals. Despite qualifying with the world No. 5 ranking, Federer was absent due to an ongoing knee injury.

Andrey Rublev and Diego Schwartzman made their tournament debuts.

Seeds

Alternates

Draw

Finals

Group Tokyo 1970

Group London 2020

Standings are determined by: 1. number of wins; 2. number of matches; 3. in two-players-ties, head-to-head records; 4. in three-players-ties, percentage of sets won, then percentage of games won; 5. ATP rankings.

External links 
Official website
Draw

References

Singles